Caluca is a commune of Angola, located in the province of Zaire.

See also 

 Communes of Angola

References 

Populated places in Zaire Province
Former populated places in Angola